Pooja Kadian (born 1 October 1991 is an Indian Wushu player. She won Silver Medal in invitational sports of Wushu at the 9th World Games at Cali in Colombia, in Women's Sanda 60 kg.

Kadian previously won gold in the 12th South Asian Games and alsobagged silver medals in the World Games 2013 and the World Championship in 2013 and 2015. She also won gold medals in the National Games in 2014 and 2017.

Pooja won the first ever gold medal for India at 2017 World Wushu Championships.

Awards 
She was awarded by the Government of India , the prestigious Arjuna Award in (2018) for her performance in 2017 World Wushu Championships.

References 

Indian sanshou practitioners
Indian female martial artists
Living people
1991 births
World Games silver medalists
Chinese martial arts
Competitors at the 2013 World Games
South Asian Games gold medalists for India
South Asian Games medalists in wushu
Recipients of the Arjuna Award
Wushu practitioners in India
Indian wushu practitioners

World Games medalists in wushu